Novak Djokovic defeated the defending champion Rafael Nadal in the final, 6–4, 6–1, 1–6, 6–3, to win the gentlemen's singles tennis title at the 2011 Wimbledon Championships. It was his first Wimbledon title and third major title overall.

With his loss to Djokovic in the final, Nadal ended his 20-match Wimbledon winning streak dating back to 2008, having missed the 2009 championships due to injury. It marked Nadal's fifth non-consecutive and last Wimbledon final. This was also the first time since 2002 that neither Roger Federer nor Nadal won the title.

Both Nadal and Djokovic were in contention for the ATP no. 1 singles ranking. By winning his semifinal match against Jo-Wilfried Tsonga, Djokovic gained the world No. 1 ranking for the first time, which marked the first time that neither Federer nor Nadal was ranked No. 1 since 2 February 2004.

This event marked two-time French Open finalist Robin Söderling's last major before being diagnosed with mononucleosis and eventually retiring from tennis.

Seeds

  Rafael Nadal (final)
  Novak Djokovic (champion)
  Roger Federer (quarterfinals)
  Andy Murray (semifinals)
  Robin Söderling (third round)
  Tomáš Berdych (fourth round)
  David Ferrer (fourth round)
  Andy Roddick (third round)
  Gaël Monfils (third round)
  Mardy Fish (quarterfinals)
  Jürgen Melzer (third round)
  Jo-Wilfried Tsonga (semifinals)
  Viktor Troicki (second round)
  Stanislas Wawrinka (second round)
  Gilles Simon (third round)
  Nicolás Almagro (third round)

  Richard Gasquet (fourth round)
  Mikhail Youzhny (fourth round)
  Michaël Llodra (fourth round)
  Florian Mayer (second round)
  Fernando Verdasco (second round)
  Alexandr Dolgopolov (first round)
  Janko Tipsarević (first round, retired due to a groin injury)
  Juan Martín del Potro (fourth round)
  Juan Ignacio Chela (second round)
  Guillermo García-López (second round)
  Marin Čilić (first round)
  David Nalbandian (third round)
  Nikolay Davydenko (first round)
  Thomaz Bellucci (first round)
  Milos Raonic (second round, retired due to a right leg injury)
  Marcos Baghdatis (third round)

Qualifying

Draw

Finals

Top half

Section 1

Section 2

Section 3

Section 4

Bottom half

Section 5

Section 6

Section 7

Section 8

References

External links

 2011 Wimbledon Championships – Men's draws and results at the International Tennis Federation

Men's Singles
Wimbledon Championship by year – Men's singles